Geeta Mehta is an Indian-American social entrepreneur, urban designer, architect and author. She is the co-founder of Asia Initiatives, and URBZ, and an adjunct professor at the Graduate School of Architecture Planning and Preservation at Columbia University.

Early life and education
Mehta was born in Simla, India. She earned her bachelor's degree in Architecture from the School of Planning and Architecture, New Delhi, a master's degree in Architecture and Urban Design from Columbia University, and a doctorate in Urban Engineering from the University of Tokyo.

Career
Mehta is an adjunct professor of architecture and urban design at the Graduate School of Architecture Planning and Preservation at Columbia University in New York City. She is also an advisor to Millennium Cities Initiative at the Earth Institute. Until 2009, Mehta was a professor of architecture at the Temple University campus in Tokyo.

She founded with business partner Jill Braden the interior design firm Braden & Mehta Design located in Honolulu and New York City. The blend of Western and Asian influences appear in the firm's work throughout U.S., Vietnam, and India as well for various corporations and private homes.

Mehta was featured in Citizen Jane: Battle for the City, a full-length documentary film about activist Jane Jacobs directed by Matt Tyrnauer. Mehta, in the film, warned that global development, without the philosophies of Jacobs, could result in "the slums of the future".

She was appointed in 2018 by New York City Mayor Bill de Blasio to serve on the Waterfront Management advisory board.

She has spoken on social capital, sustainable and equitable urbanism, and community-based change at forums in Australia, Austria, Brazil, India, Japan, UAE and the US, including the Public Ideas Form in Perth, Australia, and the Post City event at ARS Electronica in Linz, Austria and she has served as a panelist at WomenDeliver in Copenhagen, Denmark and the Women's Summit in Sharjah organized by UN Women.

She serves on the board of WomenStrong International, The Center for the Living City, and Friends of University of Tokyo. She served on the advisory board of the Millennium Cities Initiative of the Earth Institute at Columbia University, and People Building Better Cities.

Asia Initiatives

Inspired by M. S. Swaminathan, a scientist and humanist, Geeta Mehta and Krishen Mehta co-founded Asia Initiatives in 1999 in Tokyo. Since 2010 it has been registered as a 501(c)(3) non-profit organization in New York City. Asia Initiatives has also supported projects in education and healthcare in underserved areas with non-profit organizations such as the Self-Employed Women's Association in Delhi and Ahmedabad, the Center for Development in Ahmedabad, Save Indian Farmers and Parmarth Samaj Sevi Sansthan in Maharashtra, the Shohratgarh Environmental Society in UP, Friends of the Doon Society in Dehradoon, Ashta No Kai in Pune, Arpana Trust in Delhi, Women Lead in Nepal, Saving Mothers in Bangladesh, and Philippine Christian Foundation in Manila.

The M.S. Swaminathan Award was presented at the Asia Initiatives Gala to the economist Jeffrey Sachs (2014), Indra Nooyi for steering PepsiCo towards Performance with Purpose (2015) and Kerry Kennedy for her work on human rights (2016).

The 8th Secretary General of the United Nations, Ban Ki-moon, is a patron of Asia Initiatives. In his honor, Asia initiatives instituted the Ban Ki-moon Award for Women's Empowerment in 2017. The recipients of the award have included Gloria Steinem, Yue Sai Kan, Eva Haller, Prof. Chelsea Clinton, Dr. Susan Blaustein, Kathy Matsui, Cecile Richards, Madhura Swaminathan, Dr. Jane Goodall, Dr. Paul Polman and Dr. Lee Bae-yong.

SoCCs (Social Capital Credits)
Mehta developed Social Capital Credits (SoCCs) into communities across India, Ghana, Kenya, and the US, helping them incentivise their ability to help themselves by communities and individuals earning SoCCs for the common good, redeemable for services or items such as healthcare, education, and skill empowerment to help communities climb out of poverty.

The SoCCs team at Asia Initiatives works with communities to customize SoCCs menus to their specific needs and capabilities. SoCCs Earning Menus include items such as getting children vaccinated, sending children (especially daughters) to high school, waste management, providing childcare or senior care, planting trees, and paving streets. iSoCCs Redemption Menus include items such as school fees, skill training classes, home repairs and telephone talk time. CommSoCCs can then be used for common projects such as a micro-sewage system, improvements to streets or public spaces, or child-care centers. A local SoCC Manager is trained to work with the community.  Asia Initiatives also has an online platform, www.SoCCmarket.org, for trading SoCCs and capturing necessary data. SoCCs are currently being used in pilot sites in Costa Rica, Ghana, Kenya, India, and United States. with local partners that range from corporations to municipal governments. Mehta has appeared in articles in Forbes and Huffington Post which describe the creation and use of SoCCs in greater detail.

Asia Initiatives was among the six winners of the Amravati Happy Cities competition in April 2018, and has signed an MoU with the government of Andhra Pradesh to implement SoCCs in this new city.

In 2019, SoCCs was recognized as a winner of Fast Company's 2020 World Changing Ideas Awards, that honor the businesses and organizations driving change in the world.  In addition Asia Initiatives received the MIT Inclusive Innovation Award in 2019 for the Asia Region category.  In 2020, Asia Initiatives received awards from MIT SOLVE, General Motors, Vodafone and Experian. In 2021, Asia Initiative received the Jacobs Foundation Conference Grand Innovation prize.

Asia Initiatives is also partnering with SaveLIFE Foundation on implementing SoCCs on the Mumbai Pune Expressway to reduce the number of accidents and to incentivize good driving.

URBZ
With urban planner Matias Echanove and urban anthropologist Rahul Srivastava, Mehta co-founded URBZ: User Generated Cities, a research collective that focuses on participatory urban planning and design systems. URBZ was named one of the 100 most influential names in architecture in the world by the magazine Il Giornale dell'Architettura.

Bibliography
 City Connect: Regeneration, Sustainability and Equity in the 21st Century, released in 2016 by Arch-media Inc. and co-edited with George Kunihiro
 New Japan Architecture, published in 2011 by Tuttle Publishing and co-authored with Deanna MacDonald
 Japan Gardens: Tranquility, Simplicity, Harmony, released in 2008 by Tuttle Publishing and co-authored with Kimie Tada
 Japan Living: Form & Function at the Cutting Edge, released in 2008 by Tuttle Publishing and co-authored with Marcia Iwatate
 Japan Houses: Ideas for 21st Century Living, published in 2005 by Tuttle Publishing and co-authored with Iwatate; and 
 Japan Style: Architecture + Interiors + Design, released in 2004 by Tuttle Publishing and co-authored with Tada.

Awards
Mehta was named in 2015 by Women's eNews as one of the 21 leaders of the 21st century.

Personal life
Mehta is married to Krishen Mehta of New York, who retired as a partner from PricewaterhouseCoopers to advise Global Financial Integrity, and the couple has two sons, Ravi Mehta and Arjun Mehta.

References

Living people
American urban planners
Women urban planners
American women architects
Columbia Graduate School of Architecture, Planning and Preservation alumni
American people of Indian descent
American nonprofit executives
School of Planning and Architecture
University of Tokyo alumni
Year of birth missing (living people)
21st-century American women